The Reserve Bank of Vanuatu is the central bank of Vanuatu (an island country located in the South Pacific Ocean). It was initially known as the Central Bank of Vanuatu after the nation's independence from France and the United Kingdom.

The bank began operations on 1 January 1981 and was initially responsible for currency exchange. It established the Vatu as the national currency to replace the circulation of the New Hebrides franc and Australian dollar. The bank also replaced the role of the Banque Indosuez Vanuatu.

The institution's name was changed to the Reserve Bank of Vanuatu in May 1989 and its responsibility over the national banking industry was expanded.

Role
The functions, powers and responsibilities of the RBV are specified in the Reserve Bank of Vanuatu Act [CAP 125] of 1980. The specific purposes of the RBV as spelled out in Section 3 of the Reserve Bank Act are to:

Regulate the issue, supply, availability and international exchange of money;
Supervise and regulate banking business and the extension of credit;
Advise the Government on banking and monetary matters;
Promote monetary stability;
Promote a sound financial structure;
Foster financial conditions conducive to the orderly and balanced economic development of Vanuatu, and
To regulate and supervise domestic and international (offshore) banks.

It is active in promoting financial inclusion policy and a member of the Alliance for Financial Inclusion.

Board of directors
Appointments to the Board of Directors of the RBV are governed by Section 8 of the Reserve Bank Act.

Current members
Members of the board as of January 2016:
Simeon Athy, governor (since October 2013)
Anatole Hymak
Marakon Alilee
Georges Maniuri
Jimmy Nipo

Governors
John A. Howard – General Manager, Briton, 1981-1982
Patrick Noel – General Manager, 1983-1984
Edward Fillingham – 1985-1987
Franklyn Kere – First Ni Vanuatu Governor, 1988-1992
Jayant Virani – Governor, 1992-1993
Sampson Ngwele – Governor, 1993-1997
Andrew Kausiama – Governor, 1998-2003
Odo Tevi – Governor, 2003-2012
Simeon Athy – Governor, 2013-
Source:

See also
Economy of Vanuatu
Vanuatu vatu

References

External links
 Official site: Reserve Bank of Vanuatu

Economy of Vanuatu
Vanuatu
Banks of Vanuatu
1981 establishments in Vanuatu
Banks established in 1981